The 2000–01 Pro Tour season was the sixth season of the Magic: The Gathering Pro Tour. On 23 September 2000 the season began with parallel Grand Prixs in Sapporo and Porto. It ended on 12 August 2001 with the conclusion of the 2001 World Championship in Toronto. The season consisted of 27 Grand Prixs and 6 Pro Tours, held in New York, Chicago, Los Angeles, Tokyo, Barcelona, and Toronto. Also special Master Series tournaments were held at four Pro Tours. These tournaments featured huge cash prizes, but were open to only 32 players. At the end of the season Kai Budde was proclaimed Pro Player of the Year, making him the only player to win the title more than once.

Grand Prixs – Sapporo, Porto 

GP Porto (23–24 September)
 Antoine Ruel
 Olivier Ruel
 David Williams
 Michael Pustilnik
 Ryan Fuller
 Paco Llopis
 Gromko Radoslaw
 Ru Mariani Rodrigues

GP Sapporo (23–24 September)
 Satoshi Nakamura
 Takamasa Fukata
 Tomohiro Maruyama
 Kazuyuki Momose
 Kiyoshi Sasanuma
 John Taro Kageyama
 Katsuhiro Mori
 Yuji Otsubo

Pro Tour – New York (29 September – 1 October 2000) 

New York was the second team Pro Tour. Scott Johns made his fifth final day appearance. His team, "Potato Nation", did not lose a match throughout the tournament. At PT New York the master series had its debut. This was a tournament series featuring huge cash prizes, but open only to the very best players in the world. The 25 players with the most Pro Points and the 5 Players with the highest rating in the format of the Masters were invited. Additionally a gateway tournament was held on the day before the Pro Tour. In that tournament each Pro Player with at least six Pro Points could compete for one of two additional slots.

Tournament data 
Prize pool: $202,200
Players: 330 (110 teams)
Format: Team Sealed (Mercadian Masques, Nemesis, Prophecy) – first day, Team Rochester Draft (Mercadian Masques-Nemesis-Prophecy) – final two days
Head Judge: Dan Gray

Top 4

Final standings

Masters – Extended

Pro Player of the year standings

Grand Prixs – Manchester, Helsinki, Dallas, Kyoto, Phoenix, Sydney, Florence, Buenos Aires 

GP Manchester (7–8 October)
 Darwin Kastle
 John Ormerod
 Mark Le Pine
 Noah Boeken
 Justin Gary
 Marc Hernandez
 Neil Rigby
 Zvi Mowshowitz

GP Helsinki (28–29 October)
 Noah Boeken
 Erno Ekebom
 Arto Hiltunen
 Rickard Österberg
 Messaoud Bouchaib
 Dominik Hothow
 Erik Leander
 Jens Thorén

GP Dallas (28–29 October)
 Matthew Vienneau
 Chris Benafel
 Dan Clegg
 Matt Linde
 Dustin Stern
 Ben Romig
 Peter Leiher
 Trevor Blackwell

GP Kyoto (11–12 November)
 Tsuyoshi Fujita
 Yuki Murakami
 Katsuhiro Mori
 Ryan Fuller
 Eisaku Itadani
 Tsuyoshi Doyama
 Tomohiro Maruyama
 Tobey Tamber

GP Phoenix (11–12 November)
 Sean Fitzgerald
 Sean Smith
 Thomas Keller
 Scott Johns
 Robert Swarowski
 Joel Frank
 Terry Welty
 Chris Demaci

GP Sydney (18–19 November)
 Gordon Lin
 Will Copeman
 Satoshi Nakamura
 Joe Connolly
 Royce Chai
 Chris Allen
 Anatoli Lightfoot
 Kim Brebach

GP Florence (25–26 November)
 Benedikt Klauser
 Bram Snepvangers
 Kai Budde
 Martin Zürcher
 Ben Ronaldson
 Daniele Canavesi
 Mario Pascoli
 Lionel Benezech

GP Buenos Aires (25–26 November)
 Hugo Ariza
 Walter Witt
 Pablo Huerta
 Rafael Le Saux
 Diego Ostrovich
 José Barbero
 Emmanuel Duering
 Mathias Bollati

Pro Tour – Chicago (1–3 December 2000) 

Chicago was the first Pro Tour featuring the Standard format since Dallas more than four years before. In a top eight which is considered to be one of the best ever, Kai Budde won the title against Kamiel Cornelissen. He thus became the third player to win two Pro Tours. With the exception of Jay Elarar, every player in the top eight now has at least three Pro Tour top eights, including a win. In the Masters event Ben Rubin defeated Jon Finkel in the final.

Tournament data 
Prize pool: $200,130
Players: 332
Format: Standard
Head Judge: Mike Donais

Top 8

Final standings

Masters – Booster Draft

Pro Player of the year standings

Grand Prixs – Singapore, New Orleans, Amsterdam, Hiroshima 

GP Singapore (9–10 December)
 Sam Lau
 Jonathan Chan
 Kuo Tzu-Ching
 Masayuki Higashino
 Yi Jie Vice Lin
 Tishem Tham
 Boon Tat Elvin Eng
 Nicholas Wong

GP New Orleans (6–7 January)
 Bill Stead
 Michelle Bush
 Gary Rush
 Steven O'Mahoney Schwartz
 Casey McCarrel
 Eric Kesselman
 Jamie Parke
 Dustin Stern

GP Amsterdam (13–14 January)
 Chris Benafel
 Xavier Curto Vives
 Brian Davis
 Daniel O'Mahoney Schwartz
 David Price
 Antoine Ruel
 Menno Dolstra
 Alexander Witt

GP Hiroshima (27–28 January)
 Masayuki Higashino
 Masaya Mori
 Nobuaki Shikata
 Masahiko Morita
 Katsuhiro Mori
 Tsuyoshi Fujita
 Koby Okada
 Toshiki Tsukamoto

Pro Tour – Los Angeles (2–4 February 2001) 

The 2001 Pro Tour Los Angeles was the last Pro Tour held on the Queen Mary, were all previous Pro Tours in Los Angeles had been held. In a final eight featuring three players, who had also been amongst the last eight in Chicago, Michael Pustilnik took the title and thus the lead in the Pro Player of the year standings. Kamiel Cornelissen also made his second consecutive second place Pro Tour finish, the first person to do so in Pro Tour history.

Tournament data 

Players: 327
Prize Pool: $200,130
Format: Rochester Draft (Invasion)
Head Judge: Collin Jackson

Top 8

Final standings

Pro Player of the year standings

Grand Prixs – Kaohsiung, Valencia, Cologne, Boston, Prague, Rio de Janeiro 

GP Kaohsiung (10–11 February)
 Tobey Tamber
 Kuo Tzu-Ching
 King Yim Kingston Tong
 Nick Wong
 Fumio Hoshino
 Granger Petersen
 Toshiki Tsukamoto
 Hon Ming Au Yeung

GP Valencia (10–11 February)
 Ricard Tuduri
 Olivier Ruel
 Noah Boeken
 Ryan Fuller
 Michael Pustilnik
 Manuel Ramos
 Raul Mestre
 Raul Peret

GP Cologne (24–25 February)
 Jim Herold
 Antoine Ruel
 Trey Van Cleave
 Joost Vollebregt
 Daniel Zink
 Frank Karsten
 Christoph Lippert
 Jan Doise

GP Boston (24–25 February)
 Tom Swan
 Scott Johns
 Alan Comer
 Matthew Vienneau
 Brian Hegstad
 Kurtis Hahn
 Kyle Rose
 Chris Benafel

GP Prague (10–11 March)
 Ryan Fuller
 Jens Thoren
 Jakub Slemr
 Trey Van Cleave
 Thomas Preyer
 Antoine Ruel
 Kristian Kockott
 Noah Boeken

GP Rio de Janeiro (10–11 March)
 Carlos Romão
 Alex Shvartsman
 Justin Schneider
 Rafael Alvarenga
 Rafael Le Saux
 Ernesto Mingorance
 Damian Brown-Santirso
 Daniel Brasil do Carmo

Pro Tour – Tokyo (16–18 March 2001) 
The 2001 Pro Tour Tokyo saw a number of interesting firsts for the Pro Tour.  Canadian player Ryan Fuller became the first player to go undefeated in the Swiss rounds of a Pro Tour, finishing with a 14–0 record. Also, Tsuyoshi Fujita became the first Japanese player to make a Pro Tour Top 8. Ultimately it was future Hall of Fame member Zvi Mowshowitz who would take the title, winning his first individual Pro Tour.

Tournament data 

Players: 270
Prize Pool: $200,130
Format: Invasion Block Constructed (Invasion, Planeshift)
Head Judge: Chris Zantides

Top 8

Final standings

Masters – Team Rochester Draft

Pro Player of the year standings

Grand Prixs – Gothenburg, Detroit, Moscow 

GP Gothenburg (24–25 March)
 Jan Schreurs
 Josper Manne Thranne
 Raphaël Lévy
 Scott Willis
 Eivind Nitter
 Marcus Angelin
 Sondre Ellingvåg
 Jimmy Öman

GP Detroit (31 March – 1 April)
 Matthew Vienneau
 Brock Parker
 Bob Maher, Jr.
 Dan Clegg
 William Jensen
 Adam Prokopin
 Aaron Breider
 Louis Boileau

GP Moscow (21–22 April)
 Ryan Fuller
 Iwan Tan
 Yuri Markin
 Antoine Ruel
 Eugene Okin
 David Williams
 Sergey Norin
 Rustam Bakirov

Pro Tour – Barcelona (4–6 May 2001) 

In Barcelona Kai Budde became the first player to win three Pro Tours overall and also the first to win two Pro Tours in a single season. Ben Rubin won the Masters and thus became the only player to win two Masters tournaments.

Tournament data 

Players: 335
Prize Pool: $200,130
Format: Booster Draft (Invasion-Planeshift)
Head Judge: Thomas Bisballe

Top 8

Final standings

Masters – Invasion Block Constructed

Pro Player of the year standings

Grand Prixs – Yokohama, Turin, Taipei, Columbus 

GP Yokohama (12–13 May)
1. AlphaBetaUnlimited.com
 Chris Benafel
 Ryan Fuller
 David Williams
2. Poor Shark
 Masashiro Kuroda
 Tomomi Otsuka
 Masahiko Morita
3. Voice of Soul
 Tsuyoshi Douyama
 Tadayoshi Komiya
 Takao Higaki
4. Fire Beat
 Tsuyoshi Ikeda
 Toshiki Tsukamoto
 Jun Nobushita

GP Turin (26–27 May)
1. Team Clegg
 Peter Szigeti
 Brock Parker
 Daniel Clegg
2. AlphaBetaUnlimited.com
 Ryan Fuller
 Chris Benafel
 Noah Boeken
3. Angstschreeuw
 Menno Dolstra
 Jan Schreurs
 Bram Snepvangers
4. One Day Fly
 Tom Van de Logt
 Kamiel Cornelissen
 Jelger Wiegersma

GP Taipei (21–22 July)
1. www.alphabetaunlimited.com/
 David Williams
 Chris Benafel
 Daniel Clegg
2. Anchans
 Osamu Fujita
 Itaru Ishida
 Katsuhiro Mori
3. Team T.T.T.
 Kuo Tzu-Ching
 Chen Yu Wang
 Dell Sun
4. Dr. no-right
 Jack Ho
 Yen Chang Lee
 Yang Bo Wang

GP Columbus (28–29 July)
1. Your Move Games
 Darwin Kastle
 Dave Humpherys
 Rob Dougherty
2. The Ken Ho All-Stars
 Daniel Clegg
 Ken Ho
 Lan D. Ho
3. Dynasty
 Gabriel Tsang
 Brian Hacker
 Ben Rubin
4. The Ancient Kavus
 Gary Krakower
 Matthew Vienneau
 Michael Pustilnik

2001 World Championships – Toronto (8–12 August 2001) 

Tom Van de Logt won the World Championship while the United States took the team title. The final eight featured amongst several rather unknown players Antoine Ruel, Tommi Hovi, Mike Turian and David Williams, who had the dubious honour of becoming the first player to be disqualified from a Top 8.

Tournament data 
Prize pool: $210,200 (individual) + $189,000 (national teams)
Players: 296
Formats: Standard, Rochester Draft (Invasion-Planeshift-Apocalypse), Extended
Head Judge: Mike Donais

Top 8

Final standings 

* John Ormerod did not actually play in the final eight. When David Williams was disqualified he advanced to the eight place in the final standings, though.

National team competition 

  United States (Trevor Blackwell, Brian Hegstad, Eugene Harvey)
  Norway (Nicolai Herzog, Oyvind Odegaard, Jan Pieter Groenhof)

Pro Player of the year final standings 

After the World Championship Kai Budde was awarded the Pro Player of the year title. He thus became the first player to win the title more than once.

References 

Magic: The Gathering professional events